Bluff Dale is an unincorporated community in Erath County, Texas, United States.

The Bluff Dale Independent School District serves area students.

Bluff Dale, Texas is on U.S. Highway 377 and the North Paluxy River in northeastern Erath County.  It was originally called Bluff Springs by pioneers who settled nearby; Bluff Dale became the town name when the post office was established in 1877.  In 1889 when the Fort Worth and Rio Grande Railway was built, Jack Glenn donated land for the development of a town.  The town was incorporated in 1908.  By 1915 a bank and newspaper had been developed.  In 1936 Bluff Dale had 680 residents, 500 in 1940, 123 in 1980, and 300 in 1989.  In 1989 the town had a Garden Club, three churches, a volunteer fire department, five historical markers, and a beautification committee.  A gas station–convenience store was built around 2002.  Around 2005, a bank was opened up.

Population 

As of 2007, Bluff Dale's population is 2,071 people. Since 2000, it has had a population growth of -0.30 percent.

Housing 

The median home cost in Bluff Dale is $208,600. Home appreciation the last year has been -0.36 percent.

Cost of living 

Compared to the rest of the country, Bluff Dale's cost of living is 16.43% lower than average.

Education 

Bluff Dale public schools spend $6,770 per student. The average school expenditure in the U.S. is $6,058. There are about 11 students per teacher in Bluff Dale (zip 76433).

Unemployment 

The unemployment rate in Bluff Dale is 3.20 percent (U.S. average is 4.60 percent). Recent job growth is positive. Bluff Dale jobs have increased by 1.82 percent.

http://www.bestplaces.net/zip-code/Bluff_Dale_TX-77643300000.aspx

Historical markers

Bluff Dale Suspension Bridge 
This iron bridge was open to the public spanning the Paluxy River in 1891.

Berry Creek Rd. (CR-149), ¼ mile N. of US-377, Bluff Dale, Erath County Texas

While the historical marker identifies the bridge as a suspension bridge, it is actually a cable stayed bridge design, and as such is probably the oldest of its type in the United States.

http://www.historicmarkers.com/Texas/Erath_County_Texas/Bluff_Dale_Suspension_Bridge__TX441/

Bluff Dale Tabernacle 
Built in 1906; the land was donated by Andrew Glenn.  Community events, funerals, and school graduations are held here.  Originally used for early denominations in revivals that lasted for days.

Recorded Texas Historic Landmark, Texas Historical Commission, 1982.

Glenn St. and Holmes St., Bluff Dale, Erath County Texas

Old Public Water Well TX3786 

Dug around 1887 and used in the early days for travelers and cattle herds.  The well was dug by the Fort Worth Rio Grande Railroad and was primarily utilized to supply locomotives.  Still in use today.

State Historical Survey Committee, 1971.

Greenwood St., Bluff Dale, Erath County Texas

Photo gallery

Climate
The climate in this area is characterized by relatively high temperatures and evenly distributed precipitation throughout the year.  The Köppen Climate System describes the weather as humid subtropical, and uses the abbreviation Cfa.

References 

Unincorporated communities in Texas
Unincorporated communities in Erath County, Texas